The National Academy for Educational Research (NAER) is the agency of the Ministry of Education of Taiwan (ROC) responsible for conducting research in the field of education, offering training courses to school administrators, and developing educational resources.

Organizational structure

Operational divisions
 Research Center for Educational System and Policy
 Center for Educational Resources and Publishing
 Research Center for Testing and Assessment
 Research Center for Curriculum and Instruction
 Development Center for Textbook
 Center for Educational Leadership and Professional Development
 Development Center for Compilation and Translation

Administrative divisions
 Office of R&D and International Affairs
 Office of General Affairs
 Personnel Office
 Accounting Office

Branches
 Taipei Branch
 Taichung Branch

See also
 Ministry of Education (Taiwan)
 National Institute for Compilation and Translation

References

External links

 

2011 establishments in Taiwan
Educational research
Government agencies established in 2011
Research institutes in Taiwan